= Nabisar Road railway station =

Railway station in Pakistan

Coordinates: 25°02′N 69°31′E

General information
- Owner: Ministry of Railways

Other information
- Station code: NBSR

History
- Former names: Great Indian Peninsula Railway
Location

Nabisar Road railway station (Urdu: نبیسر روڈ ریلوے اسٹیشن) is located in Pakistan.

== See also ==
- List of railway stations in Pakistan
- Pakistan Railways
